The Dark Hedges is an avenue of beech trees along Bregagh Road between Armoy and Stranocum in County Antrim, Northern Ireland. The trees form an atmospheric tunnel that has been used as a location in HBO's popular television series Game of Thrones, which has resulted in the avenue becoming a popular tourist attraction.

Origin
In about 1775, James Stuart built a new house, named Gracehill House after his wife Grace Lynd. Over 150 beech trees were planted along the entrance road to the estate, to create an imposing approach.

Legend
According to legend, the hedges are visited by a ghost called the Grey Lady, who travels the road and flits across it from tree to tree. She is claimed to be either the spirit of James Stuart's daughter (named "Cross Peggy") or one of the house's maids who died mysteriously, or a spirit from an abandoned graveyard beneath the fields, who on Halloween is joined on her visitation by other spirits from the graveyard.

Filming location
The Dark Hedges was used as a filming location for the "King's Road" in the television series Game of Thrones. The trees were also used in the 2017 Transformers film The Last Knight.

Status and conservation

A tree preservation order was placed on the trees in 2004, to enable preservation and maintenance, and in 2009 the Dark Hedges Preservation Trust was set up. Of the 150 trees originally planted by the Stuart family, about 90 remained by 2016. A survey in 2014 revealed that the trees are in various states of health and are at risk in bad weather. Two trees were destroyed, and one damaged, by Storm Gertrude in January 2016. Another tree came down in Storm Doris in February 2017.  A tree toppled during Storm Hector in June 2018, and another came down during strong winds in January 2019.  Two more trees were toppled during Storm Arwen on Saturday 27 November 2021, raising further concerns about the preservation of the remaining trees.
As visitor numbers have increased, concern has been expressed over vehicular traffic damaging the trees' roots, as well as problems of graffiti and the daubing of sectarian slogans on the trees. The Woodland Trust has stated that high traffic levels might cause the trees, which are surface rooting, to last less than twenty years. In 2017 the Department of Infrastructure announced plans to close the road to traffic, due to visitor numbers causing possible damage and degradation to the site. A ban on traffic using the road (between its junctions with Ballinlea Road and Ballykenver Road) came into place on 30 October 2017. Specified exemptions to the ban include emergency and agricultural vehicles in particular circumstances.

The site is included in a list of the 12 best road trips in Great Britain and Ireland.

References

Further reading

Geography of County Antrim
Tourist attractions in County Antrim
Individual trees in Northern Ireland
Individual beech trees